Potaka is a village and rural community in Gisborne District of New Zealand's North Island. It marks the northern and western end of the Gisborne District and the Ngāti Porou tribal territory.

Lottin Point Whakatiri, located north of the main village, features a motel and small reserve.

Marae

The local Pōtaka Marae is a meeting place for Te Whānau-ā-Apanui's hapū of Te Whānau a Rutaia, and the Ngāti Porou hapū of Te Whānau a Tapuaeururangi. It includes a meeting house, known as Te Ēhutu and Te Pae o Ngā Pakanga.

In October 2020, the Government committed $520,760 from the Provincial Growth Fund to upgrade Hinemaurea ki Wharekahika and Pōtaka Marae, creating 12 jobs.

Education

Potaka School is a Year 1-8 co-educational state primary school. In 2019, it was a decile 1 school with a roll of 12.

References

Populated places in the Gisborne District